Llena de dulzura is the third album by Mexican iconic pop singer Yuri. It was released on November 25, 1981. It was instant success and the record label went overseas to expand the "yurimania", this album hit Spain, earning the first Gold Album from Spain to a Mexican singer.

Track listing  Spain Edition

Track listing Latin America Edition

Track listing Special Edition

Singles
 "Maldita Primavera"
 "Este amor ya no se toca"
 "El Pequeño Panda de Chapultepec"
 "LLena de dulzura" 
 "Deja"
 "Tú y yo"

Yuri sang "El Pequeño Panda de Chapultepec" for the little panda that was born in the Chapultepec Zoo.

Single Charts

Promotion
 Mexico 
 United States
 Central America & South America
 Spain

Sales
360000 copies - Mexico

150000 copies, Gold - Spain

1 million copies of the single "El Pequeño Panda de Chapultepec"

References

1981 albums
Yuri (Mexican singer) albums